Harold Augustine "Hal" Haid (December 21, 1897 – August 13, 1952) was a professional baseball player.  He was a right-handed pitcher over parts of six seasons (1919, 1928–1931, 1933) with the St. Louis Browns, St. Louis Cardinals, Boston Braves and Chicago White Sox.  For his career, he compiled a 14–15 record in 119 appearances, most as a relief pitcher, with a 4.16 earned run average and 103 strikeouts.

An alumnus of Belmont Abbey College, Haid was born in Barberton, Ohio and later died in Los Angeles at the age of 54.

See also
 List of Major League Baseball annual saves leaders

References

1897 births
1952 deaths
Major League Baseball pitchers
Baseball players from Ohio
Belmont Abbey Crusaders baseball players
Hanover Raiders players
St. Louis Browns players
St. Louis Cardinals players
Boston Braves players
Chicago White Sox players
People from Barberton, Ohio